Alluaudomyia is a genus of predaceous midges in the family Ceratopogonidae. There are more than 180 described species in Alluaudomyia.

See also
 List of Alluaudomyia species

References

Further reading

 
 
 

Ceratopogonidae
Chironomoidea genera
Articles created by Qbugbot